The communauté de communes du Bernavillois  is a former communauté de communes in the Somme département and in the  Picardie region of France. It was created in December 1999. It was merged into the new Communauté de communes du Territoire Nord Picardie in January 2017.

Composition 
This Communauté de communes comprised 26 communes:

Agenville
Autheux
Béalcourt
Beaumetz
Bernâtre
Bernaville
Berneuil
Boisbergues
Bonneville
Candas
Conteville
Domesmont
Domléger-Longvillers
Épécamps
Fieffes-Montrelet
Fienvillers
Frohen-sur-Authie
Gorges
Heuzecourt
Hiermont
Le Meillard
Maizicourt
Mézerolles
Montigny-les-Jongleurs
Prouville
Saint-Acheul

See also 
Communes of the Somme department

References 

Bernavillois